This is a list of notable German actors from 1895, the year of the first public showing of a motion picture by the Lumière brothers, to the present. Actors are listed in the period in which their film careers began and the careers of most spanned more than just one period. The list currently includes actors that appear in German movies, including those of foreign origin.  For the periods corresponding to the era when Germany was divided the list is split into two categories:  BRD for West German actors and DEFA for East German actors.

Early silent era (1895–1918) 

Men

 Alfred Abel
 Fritz Achterberg
 Max Adalbert
 Hans Albers
 Georg Alexander
 Carl Auen
 Felix Basch
 Albert Bassermann
 Rudolf Biebrach
 Paul Bildt
 Curt Bois
 Louis Brody
 Richard Eichberg
 Julius Falkenstein
 Olaf Fönss
 Henrik Galeen
 Curt Goetz
 John Gottowt
 Emmerich Hanus
 Heinz Hanus
 Ludwig Hartau
 Paul Hartmann
 Emil Jannings
 Victor Janson
 Hans Junkermann
 Fritz Kampers
 Bruno Kastner
 Friedrich Kayssler
 Fritz Kortner
 Werner Krauss
 Friedrich Kühne
 Rudolf Lettinger
 Harry Liedtke
 Theodor Loos
 Hans Mierendorff
 Alexander Moissi
 Paul Otto
 Max Pallenberg
 Lupu Pick
 Harry Piel
 Franz Porten
 Heinrich Schroth
 Fritz Schulz
 Reinhold Schünzel
 Viktor Schwanneke
 Walter Steinbeck
 Hermann Thimig
 Jakob Tiedtke
 Karl Valentin
 Hermann Vallentin
 Conrad Veidt
 Gustav Waldau
 Paul Wegener
 Eduard von Winterstein
 Friedrich Zelnik
 Wolfgang Zilzer

Women

 Fern Andra
 Hanne Brinkmann
 Maria Carmi
 Lil Dagover
 Blandine Ebinger
 Maria Forescu
 Käthe Haack
 Cläre Lotto
 Eva May
 Mia May
 Lya Mara
 Anna Müller-Lincke
 Pola Negri
 Asta Nielsen
 Aud Egede Nissen
 Ossi Oswalda
 Henny Porten
 Lyda Salmonova
 Adele Sandrock
 Magda Sonja
 Rosa Valetti
 Elsa Wagner
 Dorrit Weixler
 Maria Zelenka

Late silent era (1919–1930) 

Men

 Hans Albers
 Siegfried Arno
 Hans Behrendt
 Wilhelm Bendow
 Charly Berger
 Paul Biensfeldt
 Hans Brausewetter
 Eugen Burg
 Ernst Deutsch
 Carl de Vogt
 Gustav Diessl
 Wilhelm Dieterle
 Max Ehrlich
 Karl Etlinger
 Ferdinand Exl
 Hugo Fischer-Köppe
 Albert Florath
 Willi Forst
 Rudolf Forster
 Willy Fritsch
 Gustav Fröhlich
 Otto Gebühr
 Heinrich George
 Kurt Gerron
 Bernhard Goetzke
 Alexander Granach
 Veit Harlan
 Wolfgang Heinz
 Paul Henckels
 Oskar Homolka
 Paul Hörbiger
 Oskar Karlweis
 Rudolf Klein-Rogge
 Eugen Klöpfer
 František Lederer
 Fred Louis Lerch
 Kurt Lilien
 Hubert von Meyerinck
 Paul Morgan
 Albert Paulig
 Fritz Rasp
 Paul Richter
 Johannes Riemann
 Walter Rilla
 Ralph Arthur Roberts
 Max Schreck
 Oskar Sima
 Ernst Stahl-Nachbaur
 Albert Steinrück
 Igo Sym
 Szöke Szakall
 Jack Trevor
 Conrad Veidt
 Kurt Vespermann
 Otto Wallburg
 Gustav von Wangenheim
 Otto Wernicke
 Mathias Wieman

Women

 Truus van Aalten
 Marcella Albani
 Betty Amann
 Charlotte Ander
 Lissy Arna
 Vilma Bánky
 Anita Berber
 Elisabeth Bergner
 Betty Bird
 Renate Brausewetter
 Louise Brooks
 Mady Christians
 María Corda
 Maly Delschaft
 Xenia Desni
 Marlene Dietrich
 Anita Dorris
 Käthe Dorsch
 Wera Engels
 Lucie Englisch
 Anna Exl
 Greta Garbo
 Dora Gerson
 Valeska Gert
 Therese Giehse
 Erika Glässner
 Nora Gregor
 Ilka Grüning
 Liane Haid
 Lilian Harvey
 Brigitte Helm
 Trude Hesterberg
 Lucie Höflich
 Camilla Horn
 Jenny Jugo
 La Jana
 Liesl Karlstadt
 Inge Landgut
 Gilda Langer
 Helena Makowska
 Fee Malten
 Lucie Mannheim
 Maria Matray
 Gerda Maurus
 Erna Morena
 Grete Mosheim
 Renate Müller
 Käthe von Nagy
 Anny Ondra
 Dita Parlo
 Lya de Putti
 Hanna Ralph
 Leni Riefenstahl
 Margarete Schön
 Dagny Servaes
 Hilde von Stolz
 Agnes Straub
 Charlotte Susa
 Olga Tschechowa
 Hilde Wagener
 Hedwig Wangel
 Hertha von Walther
 Ruth Weyher
 Anna May Wong
 Ida Wüst

Early sound era (1928–1935) 

Men

 Hans Albers
 Wolf Ackva
 Wolf Albach-Retty
 Günther Ballier
 Paul Beckers
 Gerhard Bienert
 Willy Birgel
 Horst Birr
 Beppo Brem
 Volker von Collande
 Karl Dannemann
 Viktor de Kowa
 René Deltgen
 Hans Deppe
 Karl Ludwig Diehl
 Will Dohm
 Erich Dunskus
 Josef Egger
 Josef Eichheim
 Erich Fiedler
 Werner Finck
 Fritz Genschow
 Heinrich George
 Friedrich Gnaß
 Gustaf Gründgens
 Ferdinand Hart
 Paul Hartmann
 O. E. Hasse
 Emil Hegetschweiler
 Karl Hellmer
 Hans Henninger
 Oskar Höcker
 Attila Hörbiger
 Fritz Imhoff
 Paul Kemp
 Erich Kestin
 Jan Kiepura
 Paul Klinger
 Ernst Legal
 Hans Leibelt
 Wolfgang Liebeneiner
 Albert Lieven
 Theo Lingen
 Eduard Linkers
 Günther Lüders
 Kurt Meisel
 Karl Meixner
 Bernhard Minetti
 Hans Moser
 Franz Nicklisch
 Erik Ode
 Fritz Odemar
 Harald Paulsen
 Rudolf Platte
 Erich Ponto
 Hans Richter
 Richard Romanowsky
 Heinz Rühmann
 Otto Sauter-Sarto
 Franz Schafheitlin
 Werner Scharf
 Joseph Schmidt
 Albrecht Schoenhals
 Hugo Schrader
 Rudolf Schündler
 Willi Schur
 Siegfried Schürenberg
 Josef Sieber
 Leo Slezak
 Hans Söhnker
 Gustl Gstettenbaur
 Wolfgang Staudte
 Werner Stock
 Joe Stöckel
 Hans Stüwe
 Luis Trenker
 Ernst Udet
 Aribert Wäscher
 Franz Weber
 Weiß Ferdl
 Herbert Weissbach
 Heinz Wemper
 Ewald Wenck
 Carl Wery
 Adolf Wohlbrück

Women

 Gitta Alpár
 Maria Andergast
 Elise Aulinger
 Lida Baarova
 Fita Benkhoff
 Ery Bos
 Lina Carstens
 Marieluise Claudius
 Charlott Daudert
 Lien Deyers
 Marta Eggerth
 Maria Eis
 Else Elster
 Erna Fentsch
 Heli Finkenzeller
 Ellen Frank
 Ilse Fürstenberg
 Käthe Gold
 Ursula Grabley
 Dolly Haas
 Karin Hardt
 Ruth Hellberg
 Hilde Hildebrand
 Carola Höhn
 Lizzi Holzschuh
 Marianne Hoppe
 Brigitte Horney
 Hedy Kiesler
 Maria Koppenhöfer
 Hansi Knoteck
 Dorit Kreysler
 Susi Lanner
 Carsta Löck
 Trude Marlen
 Erna Morena
 Renate Müller
 Anna Müller-Lincke
 Genia Nikolajewa
 Edith Oss
 Sabine Peters
 Rotraut Richter
 Annie Rosar
 Angela Salloker
 Sybille Schmitz
 Hilde Schneider
 Magda Schneider
 Edith Schultze-Westrum
 Hilde Sessak
 Emmy Sonnemann
 Camilla Spira
 Lotte Spira
 Margit Symo
 Gretl Theimer
 Hertha Thiele
 Luise Ullrich
 Lizzi Waldmüller
 Grethe Weiser
 Hilde Weissner
 Dorothea Wieck

Third Reich (1933–1945) 

Men

 Hans Albers
 Axel von Ambesser
 Franz Arzdorf
 Ewald Balser
 Reinhold Bernt
 Erwin Biegel
 Willy Birgel
 Franz Böheim
 Dieter Borsche
 Joachim Brennecke
 Siegfried Breuer
 Hermann Brix
 Rudolf Carl
 Horst Caspar
 Paul Dahlke
 Theodor Danegger
 Friedrich Domin
 Robert Dorsay
 Heinz Engelmann
 Rudolf Fernau
 O. W. Fischer
 Hans Fitz
 Erik Frey
 Ernst Fritz Fürbringer
 Werner Fuetterer
 Heinrich George
 Beniamino Gigli
 Rudi Godden
 Alexander Golling
 Joachim Gottschalk
 Clemens Hasse
 Max Haufler
 Ullrich Haupt
 Johannes Heesters
 Werner Hinz
 Hans Holt
 Paul Hubschmid
 Karl John
 Curd Jürgens
 Wolf Kaiser
 Ernst von Klipstein
 Gustav Knuth
 Eduard Köck
 Ernst Legal
 Wolfgang Lukschy
 Ferdinand Marian
 Karl Martell
 Albert Matterstock
 Gunnar Möller
 Walter Müller
 Alfred Neugebauer
 Hans Nielsen
 Hans Olden
 Rudolf Prack
 Will Quadflieg
 Hans Quest
 Carl Raddatz
 Sepp Rist
 Heinz Rühmann
 Werner Scharf
 Raimund Schelcher
 Ludwig Schmitz
 Karl Schönböck
 Ernst Schröder
 Carl-Heinz Schroth
 Viktor Staal
 Hannes Stelzer
 Georg Thomalla
 Otto Treßler
 Paul Verhoeven
 Rudolf Vogel
 Kurt Waitzmann
 Ernst Waldow
 Heinz Welzel
 Wastl Witt

Women

 Rosa Albach-Retty
 Viktoria von Ballasko
 Maria Bard
 Ingrid Bergman
 Hedwig Bleibtreu
 Monika Burg
 Gisela von Collande
 Elfriede Datzig
 Marina von Ditmar
 Berta Drews
 Hertha Feiler
 Elisabeth Flickenschildt
 Margarete Haagen
 Marte Harell
 Heidemarie Hatheyer
 Angelika Hauff
 Kirsten Heiberg
 Ruth Hellberg
 Ursula Herking
 Margot Hielscher
 Karin Himboldt
 Maria Holst
 Gusti Huber
 Hildegard Knef
 Lotte Koch
 Hilde Körber
 Hilde Krahl
 Evelyn Künneke
 Lotte Lang
 Zarah Leander
 Maria Litto
 Ruth Lommel
 Christl Mardayn
 Leny Marenbach
 Winnie Markus
 Valerie von Martens
 Gerda Maurus
 Elfie Mayerhofer
 Irene von Meyendorff
 Lola Müthel
 Susi Nicoletti
 Ilse Petri
 Mady Rahl
 Marika Rökk
 Tatjana Sais
 Françoise Rosay
 Gretl Schörg
 Hannelore Schroth
 Hilde Seipp
 Erna Sellmer
 Kristina Söderbaum
 Maria von Tasnady
 Erika von Thellmann
 Jane Tilden
 Alice Treff
 Gisela Uhlen
 Anneliese Uhlig
 Ilse Werner
 Paula Wessely
 Agnes Windeck
 Gusti Wolf
 Sonja Ziemann

Post-war years and the 1950s

BRD 
Men

 Hans Albers
 Mario Adorf
 Thomas Alder
 Michael Ande
 Eddi Arent
 Arno Assmann
 Balduin Baas
 Ulrich Beiger
 Martin Benrath
 Claus Biederstaedt
 Hans Christian Blech
 Karlheinz Böhm
 Hans von Borsody
 Pinkas Braun
 Horst Buchholz
 Bully Buhlan
 Peter Carsten
 Hans Clarin
 Wolfgang Condrus
 Heinz Conrads
 Ivan Desny
 Christian Doermer
 Heinz Drache
 Eckart Dux
 Fritz Eckhardt
 Heinz Erhardt
 Paul Esser
 Hansjörg Felmy
 Bert Fortell
 Horst Frank
 Peter Frankenfeld
 Robert Freytag
 Gert Fröbe
 Joachim Fuchsberger
 Götz George
 Rex Gildo
 Walter Giller
 Reinhard Glemnitz
 Boy Gobert
 Robert Graf
 Heinrich Gretler
 Kurt Großkurth
 Klaus Havenstein
 Martin Held
 Jan Hendriks
 Michael Hinz
 Gert Günther Hoffmann
 Claus Holm
 Thomas Hörbiger
 Adrian Hoven
 Chris Howland
 Wolfgang Jansen
 Horst Janson
 Günther Jerschke
 Harald Juhnke
 Roland Kaiser
 Helmut Käutner
 Alexander Kerst
 Klaus Kinski
 Walter Kohut
 Reinhard Kolldehoff
 Peter Kraus
 Hardy Krüger
 Volker Lechtenbrink
 Stanislav Ledinek
 Rudolf Lenz
 Karl Lieffen
 Helmut Lohner
 Hanns Lothar
 Paul Löwinger
 Klaus Löwitsch
 Siegfried Lowitz
 Alf Marholm
 Josef Meinrad
 Günter Meisner
 Hannes Messemer
 Harry Meyen
 Willy Millowitsch
 Lutz Moik
 Peter Mosbacher
 Fritz Muliar
 Reggie Nalder
 Wolfgang Neuss
 Rolf Olsen
 Peter Pasetti
 Werner Peters
 Günter Pfitzmann
 Gunther Philipp
 Wolfgang Preiss
 Helmut Qualtinger
 Freddy Quinn
 Charles Regnier
 Heinz Reincke
 Raoul Retzer
 Walther Reyer
 Rudolf Rhomberg
 Gerhard Riedmann
 Paul Edwin Roth
 Maximilian Schell
 Erich Schellow
 Helmut Schmid
 Peer Schmidt
 Rudolf Schock
 Hermann Schomberg
 Dietmar Schönherr
 Carl-Heinz Schroth
 Heinz Schubert
 Werner Schumacher
 Erik Schumann
 Heinrich Schweiger
 Walter Sedlmayr
 Sigfrit Steiner
 Erwin Strahl
 Horst Tappert
 Carlos Thompson
 Herbert Tiede
 Fritz Tillmann
 Vico Torriani
 Peter van Eyck
 Peter Vogel
 Wolfgang Völz
 Peter Weck
 Heinz Weiss
 Oskar Werner
 Bernhard Wicki
 Claus Wilcke
 Christian Wolff
 Ralf Wolter
 Klausjürgen Wussow
 Harry Wüstenhagen
 Helmut Zacharias

Women

 Elke Aberle
 Dawn Addams
 Anouk Aimée
 Ingrid Andree
 Karin Baal
 Vivi Bach
 Eva Bartok
 Erica Beer
 Sabine Bethmann
 Anne-Marie Blanc
 Hannelore Bollmann
 Cornell Borchers
 Heidi Brühl
 Susanne Cramer
 Germaine Damar
 Karin Dor
 Ruth Drexel
 Annemarie Düringer
 Inge Egger
 Maria Emo
 Renate Ewert
 Claude Farell
 Helga Feddersen
 Violetta Ferrari
 Kai Fischer
 Veronika Fitz
 Lore Frisch
 Cornelia Froboess
 Wera Frydtberg
 Gardy Granass
 Brigitte Grothum
 Waltraut Haas
 Carla Hagen
 Edith Hancke
 Nicole Heesters
 Trude Herr
 Loni Heuser
 Marianne Hold
 Christiane Hörbiger
 Ulla Jacobsson
 Gertraud Jesserer
 Bibi Johns
 Heidi Kabel
 Elma Karlowa
 Christine Kaufmann
 Eva Kerbler
 Alice Kessler
 Ellen Kessler
 Doris Kirchner
 Johanna von Koczian
 Eva Kotthaus
 Elfriede Kuzmany
 Tilly Lauenstein
 Lotte Ledl
 Ruth Leuwerik
 Ursula Lillig
 Ursula Lingen
 Gerlinde Locker
 Erni Mangold
 Marie-Luise Marjan
 Johanna Matz
 Christiane Maybach
 Katharina Mayberg
 Inge Meysel
 Marion Michael
 Brigitte Mira
 Vera Molnar
 Elisabeth Müller
 Christiane Nielsen
 Margit Nünke
 Ilse Pagé
 Lilli Palmer
 Rita Paul
 Maria Perschy
 Ina Peters
 Eva Pflug
 Eva Probst
 Liselotte Pulver
 Laya Raki
 Nadja Regin
 Erika Remberg
 Barbara Rütting
 Maria Schell
 Romy Schneider
 Ingeborg Schöner
 Edith Schultze-Westrum
 Maria Sebaldt
 Alma Seidler
 Sabina Sesselmann
 Sabine Sinjen
 Ann Smyrner
 Elke Sommer
 Herta Staal
 Ruth Stephan
 Ilse Steppat
 Helene Thimig
 Nadja Tiller
 Margot Trooger
 Gisela Trowe
 Vera Tschechowa
 Caterina Valente
 Ingrid van Bergen
 Helen Vita
 Antje Weisgerber
 Elisabeth Wiedemann
 Hanne Wieder
 Christa Williams
 Marianne Wischmann

DEFA 
Men

 Gerhard Bienert
 Fred Delmare
 Fritz Diez
 Fred Düren
 Hans Finohr
 Erwin Geschonneck
 Hannjo Hasse
 Ezard Haußmann
 Wolfgang Heinz
 Martin Hellberg
 Albert Hetterle
 Wolf Kaiser
 Willy A. Kleinau
 Wolfgang Kieling
 Hans Klering
 Heinz Klevenow
 Herbert Köfer
 Manfred Krug
 Horst Kube
 Armin Mueller-Stahl
 Leon Niemczyk
 Werner Peters
 Herbert Richter
 Günther Simon
 Ekkehard Schall
 Raimund Schelcher
 Helmut Schreiber
 Heinz Schubert
 Horst Schulze
 Günther Simon
 Hilmar Thate
 Ulrich Thein
 Rudolf Ulrich
 Gerry Wolff

Women

 Christel Bodenstein
 Carola Braunbock
 Angela Brunner
 Annekathrin Bürger
 Barbara Dittus
 Helga Göring
 Eva-Maria Hagen
 Angelika Hurwicz
 Inge Keller
 Ruth Maria Kubitschek
 Steffie Spira
 Sonja Sutter
 Sabine Thalbach

The 1960s

BRD 
Men

 Werner Abrolat
 Lukas Ammann
 Gerd Baltus
 Lex Barker
 Rainer Basedow
 Hans-Jürgen Bäumler
 Rolf Becker
 Helmut Berger
 Peter Berling
 Uwe Beyer
 Roy Black
 Gerd Böckmann
 Hark Bohm
 Marquard Bohm
 Horst Bollmann
 Arthur Brauss
 Pierre Brice
 Karl Dall
 Gernot Endemann
 Werner Enke
 Rainer Werner Fassbinder
 Uwe Friedrichsen
 Thomas Fritsch
 Herbert Fux
 Vadim Glowna
 Stewart Granger
 Helmut Griem
 Hans Peter Hallwachs
 Gert Haucke
 Bernd Herzsprung
 Robert Hoffmann
 Klaus Höhne
 Udo Jürgens
 Udo Kier
 Wolfgang Kieling
 Wilfried Klaus
 Hans Korte
 Hellmut Lange
 Friedrich von Ledebur
 Harald Leipnitz
 Ulli Lommel
 Walo Lüönd
 Henry van Lyck
 Ferdy Mayne
 George Nader
 Werner Pochath
 Kurt Raab
 Ilja Richter
 Klaus Schwarzkopf
 Heintje Simons
 Fritz Wepper
 Rolf Zacher

Women

 Helga Anders
 Hannelore Auer
 Vivi Bach
 Ina Bauer
 Iris Berben
 Senta Berger
 Jana Brejchová
 Ingrid Caven
 Hannelore Elsner
 Uschi Glas
 Mascha Gonska
 Gitte Haenning
 Gisela Hahn
 Irm Hermann
 Hannelore Hoger
 Karin Hübner
 Anna Karina
 Diana Körner
 Sylva Koscina
 Christiane Krüger
 Ruth Maria Kubitschek
 Doris Kunstmann
 Daliah Lavi
 Monika Lundi
 Margot Mahler
 Michaela May
 Marisa Mell
 Anita Pallenberg
 Erika Pluhar
 Witta Pohl
 Andrea Rau
 Eva Renzi
 Letitia Roman
 Catherine Schell
 Christiane Schmidtmer
 Barbara Schöne
 Christine Schuberth
 Hanna Schygulla
 Jutta Speidel
 Alexandra Stewart
 Ewa Strömberg
 Margarethe von Trotta
 Susanne Uhlen
 Barbara Valentin
 Marie Versini
 Elisabeth Volkmann
 Heidelinde Weis
 Gila von Weitershausen
 Thekla Carola Wied
 Angela Winkler
 Judy Winter
 Christine Wodetzky
Elke Sommer

DEFA 
Men

 Peter Borgelt
 Eberhard Esche
 Thomas Fritsch
 Jürgen Frohriep
 Winfried Glatzeder
 Michael Gwisdek
 Jürgen Hentsch
 Rolf Herricht
 Rolf Hoppe
 Manfred Karge
 Horst Krause
 Dieter Mann
 Gojko Mitić
 Armin Müller-Stahl
 Rolf Römer
 Frank Schöbel
 Reiner Schöne
 Gunter Schoß
 Jaecki Schwarz
 Alfred Struwe
 Manfred Zetzsche

Women

 Carmen-Maja Antoni
 Renate Blume
 Barbara Brylska
 Annekathrin Bürger
 Angelica Domröse
 Cox Habbema
 Jutta Hoffmann
 Blanche Kommerell
 Vera Oelschlegel
 Jutta Wachowiak
 Ursula Werner
 Monika Woytowicz

The 1970s

BRD 
Men

 Herbert Achternbusch
 Christian Anders
 Peer Augustinski
 Harry Baer
 Gustl Bayrhammer
 Ekkehardt Belle
 David Bennent
 Heinz Bennent
 Helmut Berger
 Christian Berkel
 Josef Bierbichler
 Uwe Bohm
 Markus Boysen
 Klaus Maria Brandauer
 Jacques Breuer
 Jochen Busse
 Rudi Carrell
 Burkhard Driest
 Sky du Mont
 Christoph Eichhorn
 Helmut Fischer
 Herbert Fleischmann
 Herbert Grönemeyer
 Matthias Habich
 Dieter Hallervorden
 Raimund Harmstorf
 Reinhard Hauff
 Dieter Thomas Heck
 Sascha Hehn
 André Heller
 Heinz Hoenig
 Dominique Horwitz
 Rainer Hunold
 Gottfried John
 Günther Kaufmann
 Peter Kern
 Christian Kohlund
 Diether Krebs
 Günter Lamprecht
 Dieter Laser
 Hermann Lause
 Heiner Lauterbach
 Peter Maffay
 Dietrich Mattausch
 Peter Millowitsch
 Josef Moosholzer
 Marius Müller-Westernhagen
 Thomas Ohrner
 Hanno Pöschl
 Jürgen Prochnow
 Tilo Prückner
 Christian Quadflieg
 Alexander Radszun
 Chris Roberts
 Udo Samel
 Otto Sander
 Michael Schanze
 Dieter Schidor
 Walter Schmidinger
 Martin Semmelrogge
 Bernd Tauber
 Rüdiger Vogler
 Konstantin Wecker
 Elmar Wepper
 Rudolf Wessely
 Hanns Zischler

Women

 Adelheid Arndt
 Monica Bleibtreu
 Tabea Blumenschein
 Ursula Buchfellner
 Mareike Carrière
 Margit Carstensen
 Ingrid Caven
 Ute Christensen
 Edith Clever
 Sybil Danning
 Gaby Dohm
 Tina Engel
 Constanze Engelbrecht
 Maria Furtwängler
 Evelyn Hamann
 Anja Jaenicke
 Nastassja Kinski
 Hildegard Krekel
 Lisa Kreuzer
 Barbara Lass
 Anita Lochner
 Eva Mattes
 Sabine von Maydell
 Sunnyi Melles
 Evelyn Opela
 Olivia Pascal
 Patricia Rhomberg
 Karin Schubert
 Ingrid Steeger
 Barbara Sukowa
 Elisabeth Trissenaar
 Dietlinde Turban
 Rosel Zech

DEFA 
Men

 Vlastimil Brodský
 Henry Hübchen
 Uwe Kockisch
 Jiří Menzel
 Amza Pellea
 Franciszek Pieczka
 Dean Reed
 Peter Sodann

Women

 Violeta Andrei
 Petra Hinze
 Ursula Karusseit
 Renate Krößner
 Katrin Sass
 Johanna Schall
 Christine Schorn
 Katharina Thalbach
 Franziska Troegner
 Beata Tyszkiewicz

The 1980s

BRD 
Men

 Mario Adorf
 Dirk Bach
 Gedeon Burkhard
 Ottfried Fischer
 Thomas Gottschalk
 Dominik Graf
 Alexander Held
 Hannes Jaenicke
 Burghart Klaußner
 Herbert Knaup
 Horst Krause
 Mike Krüger
 Horst Kummeth
 Heiner Lauterbach
 Robert Meyer
 Axel Milberg
 Richy Müller
 Uwe Ochsenknecht
 Daniel Olbrychski
 Christoph M. Ohrt
 Gerhard Polt
 Christian Redl
 Ralf Richter
 Udo Samel
 Peter Sattmann
 Werner Stocker
 Jürgen Tonkel
 Christian Tramitz
 Ulrich Tukur
 Otto Waalkes
 Klaus Wennemann
 Manfred Zapatka
 August Zirner

Women

 Adriana Altaras
 Barbara Auer
 Julia Biedermann
 Katharina Böhm
 Suzanne von Borsody
 Marita Breuer
 Renan Demirkan
 Anica Dobra
 Beate Finckh
 Katja Flint
 Ursula Karven
 Ulrike Krumbiegel
 Gudrun Landgrebe
 Dagmar Manzel
 Maja Maranow
 Valerie Niehaus
 Jennifer Nitsch
 Désirée Nosbusch
 Christina Plate
 Sibylle Rauch
 Katja Riemann
 Barbara Rudnik
 Marianne Sägebrecht
 Birge Schade
 Maria Schrader
 Lena Stolze
 Barbara Sukowa
 Anna Thalbach
 Dana Vávrová

DEFA 
Men

 Matthias Freihof
 Sylvester Groth
 Robert Gwisdek
 André Hennicke
 Bernd Michael Lade
 Jan Josef Liefers
 Sven Martinek
 Ulrich Mühe
 Jörg Schüttauf

Women

 Julia Jäger
 Dagmar Manzel
 Simone Thomalla

The 1990s 
Men

 Henning Baum
 Rufus Beck
 Ben Becker
 Alexander Beyer
 Moritz Bleibtreu
 Daniel Brühl
 Detlev Buck
 Fabian Busch
 August Diehl
 Justus von Dohnányi
 Heino Ferch
 Benno Fürmann
 Frank Giering
 Josef Hader
 Leander Haußmann
 Michael Herbig
 Bernhard Hoëcker
 Marc Hosemann
 Rick Kavanian
 Michael Kessler
 Herbert Knaup
 Sebastian Koch
 Konrad Krauss
 Thomas Kretschmann
 Joachim Król
 Dani Levy
 Jan Josef Liefers
 Thomas Limpinsel
 Florian Lukas
 Ulrich Matthes
 Wotan Wilke Möhring
 Tobias Moretti
 Ingo Naujoks
 Ulrich Noethen
 Götz Otto
 Bastian Pastewka
 Armin Rohde
 Michael Roll
 Ilja Rosendahl
 Tobias Schenke
 Helge Schneider
 Til Schweiger
 Matthias Schweighöfer
 Hilmi Sözer
 Robert Stadlober
 Hans Steinberg
 Devid Striesow
 Wolfgang Stumph
 Jürgen Vogel
 Kai Wiesinger
 Haydar Zorlu

Women

 Muriel Baumeister
 Marie Bäumer
 Meret Becker
 Anna Brüggemann
 Yvonne de Bark
 Ellen ten Damme
 Maruschka Detmers
 Anke Engelke
 Verona Feldbusch
 Veronica Ferres
 Martina Gedeck
 Eva Habermann
 Cosma Shiva Hagen
 Wolke Hegenbarth
 Mavie Hörbiger
 Nina Hoss
 Julia Hummer
 Julia Jentsch
 Salome Kammer
 Alexandra Kamp
 Sonja Kirchberger
 Anja Kling
 Anja Knauer
 Juliane Köhler
 Ann-Kathrin Kramer
 Nicolette Krebitz
 Alexandra Maria Lara
 Anna Loos
 Heike Makatsch
 Birgit Minichmayr
 Alexandra Neldel
 Laura Osswald
 Christiane Paul
 Nina Petri
 Franka Potente
 Sophie Rois
 Andrea Sawatzki
 Michaela Schaffrath
 Esther Schweins
 Jasmin Schwiers
 Jasmin Tabatabai
 Laura Tonke
 Idil Üner
 Tanja Wedhorn
 Hanne Wolharn
 Felicitas Woll
 Emily Wood
 Natalia Wörner
 Marie Zielcke

The 2000s 
Men

 Volker Bruch
 Stipe Erceg
 Florian David Fitz
 Francois Goeske
 Christoph Maria Herbst
 Fabian Hinrichs
 Mirko Lang
 Elyas M'Barek
 Oliver Pocher
 Vincent Redetzki
 Lucas Reiber
 Mirco Reseg
 Max Riemelt
 Tom Schilling
 David Schütter
 Jan Sosniok
 Max von der Groeben
 Dirk Weiler
 Philip Wiegratz
 Daniel Wiemer
 Ronald Zehrfeld
 Flula Borg

Women

 Natalia Avelon
 Jella Haase
 Karoline Herfurth
 Hannah Herzsprung
 Martina Hill
 Alwara Höfels
 Sandra Hüller
 Franziska Junge
 Sibel Kekilli
 Friederike Kempter
 Nursel Köse
 Anna Maria Mühe
 Alexandra Neldel
 Ilona Otto
 Jana Pallaske
 Paula Riemann
 Katharina Schüttler
 Emma Schweiger
 Luna Schweiger
 Maria Simon
 Sabine Timoteo
 Nora Tschirner
 Araba Walton
 Franziska Weisz
 Teresa Weißbach
 Tanja Wenzel
 Johanna Wokalek

The 2010s 
Men

 Nicolai Borger 

Women

 Lena Klenke

See also 
:Category:German actors

:Category:Film by year
List of years in film
List of German people
List of French actors

Notes

Further reading 
 Friedemann Beyer, Die Ufa-Stars im Dritten Reich. Frauen für Deutschland, (Heyne) 1989
 Friedemann Beyer, Die Gesichter der Ufa. Starportraits einer Epoche, (Heyne) 1992
 Ralf Schenk, Vor der Kamera. Fünfzig Schauspieler in Babelsberg, (Henschel) 1995
 Georg Markus, Die ganz Großen. Erinnerungen an die Lieblinge des Publikums, (Amalthea) 2000 (deutschsprachiger Film der 30er bis 60er Jahre)
 Cinzia Romani, Die Filmdiven des dritten Reiches. Stars zwischen Kult und Terror, (Schüren Presseverlag) 2001
 Frank-Burkhard Habel and Volker Wachter, Lexikon der DDR-Stars. Schauspieler aus Film und Fernsehen, (Schwarzkopf & Schwarzkopf) 2002
 Ulrich Liebe, Verehrt, verfolgt, vergessen. Schauspieler als Naziopfer, (Beltz) 2003
 Manfred Hobsch, Klaus Rathje, Ralf Krämer, Filmszene D. Die 250 wichtigsten jungen deutschen Stars aus Kino und TV, (Schwarzkopf & Schwarzkopf) 2004
 Johann Caspar Glenzdorf: Glenzdorfs internationales Film-Lexikon. Biographisches Handbuch für das gesamte Filmwesen. Herausgegeben zum 30jährigen Jubiläum des deutschen Tonfilms. 3 Bände. Bad Münder (Deister): Prominent-Filmverlag 1960 – 1961.
 Joachim Reichow ; Michael Hanisch: Filmschauspieler A – Z. Berlin: Henschel, diverse Auflagen von 1971 – 1989.
 Adolf Heinzlmeier and Berndt Schulz: Das Lexikon der deutschen Filmstars, Schwarzkopf & Schwarzkopf, 2003,

External links 
Porträts bekannter Darsteller des deutschen Films

 
German
Actors
Actors